Josephine Dodge Daskam, Mrs. Selden Bacon (February 17, 1876 – July 29, 1961) was an American writer of great versatility. She is chiefly known as a writer who made the point of having female protagonists.

Career
Josephine Dodge Daskam was born on February 17, 1876, in Stamford, Connecticut, to Anne (Loring) and Horace Sawyer Daskam. She wrote a series of juvenile mysteries, as well as works dealing with more serious themes. She published books of poetry, which were well received by critics; as noted by one critic, some of her poetry was set to music. She was published under the name "Josephine Daskam".

She also wrote on women's issues and women's roles as well. She was a pioneer in the Girl Scouts movement and compiled the guidebook used by that organization.

Bacon graduated from Smith College in 1898. She published a collection of ten short stories inspired by her experiences in 1900, intending "to deepen...the rapidly growing conviction that the college girl is very much like any other girl."

Personal life
In 1903, Josephine Daskam wed Selden Bacon, a lawyer. The couple had three children: Anne, Deborah, and Selden Jr. 

Josephine Daskam Bacon died in 1961, aged 85. She was interred in All Souls Onteora Park Church Cemetery, Hunter, Greene County, New York.

List of works

References

External links

 
 
 
 Josephine Dodge Daskam Bacon Papers, 1876-1961, Sophia Smith Collection, Smith College.
 Josephine Dodge Daskam Bacon Papers at the Sophia Smith Collection, Smith College Special Collections

1876 births
1961 deaths
American children's writers
American women novelists
20th-century American novelists
American women children's writers
20th-century American women writers
Smith College alumni